The major municipal areas which are a part of the Kolkata Metropolitan Development Authority or KMDA  Kolkata conurbation are:

Many towns in Greater Kolkata are being incorporated within the Kolkata postal area, with their postal PIN codes being changed so that these areas can be identified with the larger metropolitan area.

References

Geography of Kolkata
 
Kolkata